The Leader of the Opposition in the Puducherry Legislative Assembly is the politician who leads the official opposition in  the Puducherry Legislative Assembly. The current  Leader of the Opposition is R. Siva.

List of opposition leaders of Puducherry representative assembly (1955-1963)
The tenure of different leaders of opposition of Puducherry Representative Assembly is given below

List of opposition leaders of Puducherry legislative assembly (since 1963)
The tenure of different leaders of opposition of Puducherry Legislative Assembly is given below

See also
 Government of Puducherry
 Lieutenant Governors of Puducherry
 Chief Minister of Puducherry
 Puducherry Legislative Assembly
 Speaker of the Puducherry Legislative Assembly
 Official Opposition
 Leader of the Opposition in the Parliament of India
 List of current Indian opposition leaders
 Elections in Puducherry

References

Notes

Puducherry Legislative Assembly
Puducherry Legislative Assembly
Puducherry